Borrenes is a village and municipality located in the region of El Bierzo (province of León, Castile and León, Spain). According to the 2010 census (INE), the municipality has a population of 402 inhabitants.

It is one of Galician speaking councils of El Bierzo

References

Municipalities in El Bierzo